The 1955–56 Texas Tech Red Raiders men's basketball team represented Texas Tech University in the Border Intercollegiate Athletic Association during the 1955–56 NCAA men's basketball season. This was Texas Tech's last year in the Border Conference before becoming members of the Southwest Conference. The head coach was Polk Robison, his 9th year with the team.

References

Texas Tech Red Raiders basketball seasons
Texas Tech
Texas Tech